10050 Cielo Drive was the street address of a former luxury home in Benedict Canyon, in the west-central part of the Beverly Crest neighborhood of Los Angeles, bordering Beverly Hills, where three members of the Manson Family committed the Tate murders in 1969.

The property had a main residence and a guest house. The main house had been occupied by various famous Hollywood and music industry figures. In 1994, both houses were demolished and a new house was constructed on the site, and the street address was changed to 10066 Cielo Drive.

Architecture
The original house was designed by Arthur W. Hawes in 1942 and completed in 1944 for French actress Michèle Morgan. It was very similar, but not exactly identical, to the house which sat on its own plateau directly below 10050, 10048 Cielo Drive, which was often called the Twin House. They were originally built on land called The Bedrock Properties and were built at the same time.

The hillside structure faced east and featured stone fireplaces, beamed ceilings, paned windows, a loft above the living room, a swimming pool and a guest house, and was surrounded by thick pine and flowering cherry trees.

According to official documents with the Los Angeles Department of Building and Safety, the architect of record for this home was Arthur W. Hawes (1873–1951). The builder was J.F. Wadkins Corp.

History
Michèle Morgan, French actress for RKO Radio Pictures, arranged for architect Robert Byrd to design a home and J.F. Wadkins to build the luxury home resembling an early 19th-century European style farmhouse. The house was completed in 1944, with an address of 10050 Cielo Drive. It was on a 3.3-acre level lot above Benedict Canyon in Beverly Hills. The home included a 3,200 square foot main residence and 2,000 square foot guest cottage. According to the Los Angeles Times, Morgan paid $32,000 (equivalent to $470,000 in 2020). By the end of World War II, Morgan had returned to France. The house was later sold to Dr. Hartley Dewey and his wife Louise who rented it to Lillian Gish in 1946, while she was filming Duel in the Sun.

Rudolph Altobelli (1929–2011), a music and film industry talent manager, bought the house for $86,000 in the early 1960s (equivalent to $ million in ) and often rented it out. Residents included Cary Grant and Dyan Cannon (it was their honeymoon nest in 1965), Henry Fonda, George Chakiris, Mark Lindsay, Samantha Eggar, and Olivia Hussey. Charles Manson visited the house in late 1968, when it was occupied (from May 1966 to January 1969) by couple Terry Melcher (the son of actress Doris Day) and Candice Bergen with roommate/talent-manager Roger Hart. The couple split in early 1969, with Melcher relocating to Malibu.

In February 1969, Roman Polanski and his wife Sharon Tate began renting the home from Altobelli. On August 8–9, 1969, the home became the scene of the murders of Tate, Wojciech Frykowski, Abigail Folger, Jay Sebring, and Steven Parent committed by Tex Watson, Susan Atkins, and Patricia Krenwinkel. William Garretson, Altobelli's caretaker and an acquaintance of Parent, lived in the guest house behind the main house and originally said he was unaware of the murders until the next morning, when he was taken into custody by police officers who had arrived at the scene. He was later cleared of all charges.

Altobelli moved into the house just three weeks after the murders and resided there until 1988. During an interview on ABC's show 20/20, he said that while living there, he felt "safe, secure, loved and beauty". The house was then sold to John Prell, a real estate investor. The purchase price was $1.6 million in 1989 (equivalent to $ million in ). In 1992, Prell sold the property to Alvin Weintraub, another real estate investor.

Nine Inch Nails and Marilyn Manson
The final resident of the original house was the musician Trent Reznor of Nine Inch Nails. Reznor rented the house from 1992 and set up a recording studio there. This studio, dubbed "Pig" (sometimes called "Le Pig") in a reference to murderer Susan Atkins' writing "Pig" in Tate's blood on the front door of the house, was the site of recording sessions for most of the Nine Inch Nails album The Downward Spiral (1994). The band also recorded the EP Broken and filmed the video for "Gave Up" at 10050 Cielo Drive. Marilyn Manson recorded sections of the album Portrait of an American Family at the in-house studio in 1992.

Reznor moved out in December 1993, later explaining "there was too much history in that house for me to handle."

Reznor made a statement about working in the Tate house during a 1997 interview with Rolling Stone:

Reznor took the front door of the house with him when he moved out, installing it at Nothing Studios, his new recording studio/record label headquarters in New Orleans.  Nothing Studios was later sold and the façade of the building changed. The front door Reznor removed from 10050 Cielo Drive is currently preserved in the possession of Christopher Moore, a New Orleans artist who acquired it from the owner of the building.

Demolition
After renting out the house, Alvin Weintraub had it demolished in 1994, and construction on a new home began later that same year. In 1996, the newly constructed home was completed, that he named Villa Bella, and obtained a new address for the property, 10066 Cielo Drive. The home does not resemble the residence in which the Tate murders occurred. It is an 18,000-square-foot Mediterranean-style mansion. When he listed Villa Bella for sale in 1998, Weintraub assured Los Angeles magazine that this was certainly not the Manson murder house. "We went to great pains to get rid of everything ... There’s no house, no dirt, no blade of grass remotely connected to Sharon Tate."

The owner of the property as of December 2013 was Hollywood producer Jeff Franklin. In 2010, he had made this comment to Architectural Digest: "What I fell in love with here was the setting, the view, the privacy and the amount of flat land" but complained that the design of the house was badly conceived. The property was on the market in August 2019, showing an estimated price of $97 million. It again was on the market in January 2022 for $85 million, reduced in price in June 2022 to just under $70 million.

References

Houses in Los Angeles
Manson Family
Beverly Crest, Los Angeles
Cielo
Cielo
Cielo
1944 establishments in California
1994 disestablishments in California
Trent Reznor
Nine Inch Nails
Demolished buildings and structures in Los Angeles